Maurice Balfour Wright Bergl (1917–1998), was a male English international table tennis player.

Table tennis career
He was a leading England international player during the 1930s and 1940s. He reached the number 3 ranking of Britain and was runner-up in the English Championship in 1934. He competed in the 1935 World Table Tennis Championships and 1936 World Table Tennis Championships.

Personal life
He was born in 1917 in Russia and came to England in 1920. He married in 1945. He died in 1998 in Bermuda.

See also
 List of table tennis players

References

1917 births
2009 deaths
English male table tennis players
Soviet emigrants to the United Kingdom